Hobby World is the largest publishing house in Russia and Eastern Europe specializing in producing and distributing board games of the following categories: games for children, family games, party games, strategy games, military games, collectible card games. The head office is located in Moscow, the Kyiv regional office has been open since 2012.

Company history

Foundation
The company was founded in 2010 through the merger of the two competing companies «Smart» and «Fantasy World».

Publishing house today
Today the publishing house sells more than half a million board games annually and publishes more than 50 new games.

Games
The company publishes Russian editions of games such as Settlers of Catan, Carcassonne, Munchkin, Ticket to Ride, Game of Thrones, Arkham Horror, Warhammer.

Company management
Mikhail Akulov – General Director.
Ivan Popov — Executive Director.
Nikolay Pegasov — Development Director. Earlier used to hold the position of chief editor and publisher of Mir Fantastiki SF magazine (2003-2009).

Production capacities
Most board games components are produced in Russia: manufactures are located in Kaluga and Moscow regions. Some components are produced by European contractors.

Activities
Hobby World regularly participates in city events and large exhibitions.

References

External links
 Official Hobby World website (RUS) 
 Official Hobby World website (ENG)
 Article on «Hobby World» in «Forbes» (RUS)
 Article on «Hobby World» in «Hopes&Fears» (RUS)
 «Russia 1» TV report about board games (RUS)
 «Hobby World» profile on «BoardGameGeek» portal (ENG)
 Official channel on «YouTube» (RUS)
 Interview with Mikhail Akulov published at Boardgamer.ru (RUS)

Game manufacturers
Companies based in Moscow